Yorkville, New York may refer to more than one place in the United States:

Yorkville, Manhattan, a neighborhood in New York City
Yorkville, Oneida County, New York